Bugulminka (Bögölmä) is a rural locality (a village) in Vozdvizhensky Selsoviet, Alsheyevsky District, Bashkortostan, Russia. The population was 131 as of 2010. There are 5 streets.

Geography 
Bugulminka is located 43 km southwest of Rayevsky (the district's administrative centre) by road. Sanatoriya imeni Chekhova is the nearest rural locality.

References 

Rural localities in Alsheyevsky District